Robert Richard Reinhard (October 17, 1920 – August 2, 1996) was an American football player who played four seasons with the Los Angeles Dons of the All-America Football Conference (AAFC). He was drafted by the Chicago Cardinals of the National Football League (NFL) in the fifth round of the 1942 NFL Draft. He played college football at the University of California, Berkeley and attended Glendale High School in Glendale, California. Reinhard was also a member of the Los Angeles Rams of the NFL. His brother Bill Reinhard also played in the AAFC.

References

External links
Just Sports Stats

1920 births
1996 deaths
Players of American football from Los Angeles
American football tackles
California Golden Bears football players
Los Angeles Dons players
Los Angeles Rams players
People from Hollywood, Los Angeles